Red and White Roses is a 1913 silent short film directed by William Humphrey and Ralph Ince. It starred Humphrey, Julia Swayne Gordon and Leah Baird. It was produced by the Vitagraph Company of America and distributed by the General Film Company.

It survives in the Library of Congress.

Cast
William Humphrey - Morgan Andrews
Julia Swayne Gordon - Lida de Jeanne
Leah Baird - Beth Whitney
L. Rogers Lytton - Ralph Clark
Earle Williams - Morgan Andrews
Edith Storey - Mrs. Andrews
Harry T. Morey - Murray

References

External links
Red and White Roses at IMDb.com

1913 films
American silent short films
American black-and-white films
Films directed by Ralph Ince
Films directed by William J. Humphrey
1910s American films